The Waiter is a 2018 Greek drama film directed by Steve Krikris.

Plot 
Renos (Aris Servetalis) is a lonely waiter whose life is turned upside down by some unexpected events.

Cast 
 Aris Servetalis as Renos
 Yannis Stankoglou as The Blond
 Alexandros Mavropoulos as Thunder
 Chiara Gensini as Tzina

References

External links 

2018 comedy films
Greek comedy films